The South Sudanese pound (ISO code and abbreviation: SSP) is the currency of the Republic of South Sudan. It is subdivided into 100 piasters. It was approved by the Southern Sudan Legislative Assembly before secession on 9 July 2011 from Sudan.  It was introduced on 18 July 2011, and replaced the Sudanese pound at par. On 1 September 2011, the Sudanese pound ceased to be legal tender in South Sudan.

On October 8, 2020, due to rapid depreciation of the South Sudanese pound's exchange rate with the United States dollar, South Sudan announced that it would soon change its currency.

Banknotes 

The banknotes feature the image of John Garang de Mabior, the late leader of South Sudan's independence movement.

Six different denominations (SSP 1, SSP 5, SSP 10, SSP 25, SSP 50, SSP 100 and SSP 500) in the form of banknotes have been confirmed, and five denominations (SSP 0.01, SSP 0.05, SSP 0.10, SSP 0.25 and SSP 0.50) will be issued in the form of coins.

Three new banknotes for SSP 0.05, SSP 0.10, and SSP 0.25 were issued 19 October 2011.

The first circulation coins of the South Sudanese pound in denominations of SSP 0.10, SSP 0.20, and SSP 0.50 were issued 9 July 2015, on occasion of the fourth anniversary of independence from Sudan.

In 2016, the Bank of South Sudan issued a SSP 20 banknote to replace the SSP 25 note. In 2018, the Bank of South Sudan introduced a SSP 500 banknote to ease daily cash transactions following years of inflation.

As part of a currency redesign to reduce confusion, a SSP 1 coin was released to replace the SSP 1 banknote, and a coin for SSP 2 has also been released. The SSP 10, SSP 20 and SSP 100 notes were all redesigned.

In November 2016, the Governor of the Bank of South Sudan issued a statement dismissing as false reports claiming that the bank was printing new notes in denominations of SSP 200, SSP 500 and SSP 1,000.

In February 2021, the Bank of South Sudan issued a SSP 1,000 banknote as part of an effort to combat rising inflation and economic crisishttps://www.voaafrica.com/a/africa_south-sudan-focus_south-sudan-sudan-address-economic-crises/6195781.html. The maroon banknote features a familiar design of John Garang on the obverse, and an image of two ostriches on the reverse.

Coins

Coins in denominations of SSP 0.10, SSP 0.20, and SSP 0.50 were put into circulation on 9 July 2015 (South Sudanese Independence Day). , South Sudan's coins are being struck at the South African Mint.

Bimetallic coins in denominations of SSP 1 and SSP 2 were put into circulation during 2016.

The Coat of arms of South Sudan with the country name 'REPUBLIC OF SOUTH SUDAN' and the date will appear on the obverses. The various coins will include the following:
 SSP 0.10 - Copper-plated Steel - Oil rig.
 SSP 0.20 - Brass-plated Steel - Shoebill stork.
 SSP 0.50 - Nickel-plated Steel - Northern white rhino.
 SSP 1 - Bronze-plated Steel centre / Nickel-plated Steel ring - Nubian giraffe.
 SSP 2 - Nickel-plated Steel centre / Bronze-plated Steel ring - African Shield.

Exchange rates 
At the time of release of the South Sudanese pound in 2011, the exchange rate was SSP 2.75 for US$1. , the commercially available exchange rate is SSP 835.38 = US$1.

References

External links 

 Articles about the banknotes of South Sudan.
 Banknotes of South Sudan.

Currencies of Africa
Currencies introduced in 2011
2011 in South Sudan
2015 in South Sudan
Economy of South Sudan
Circulating currencies
Pound (currency)